Anna Rose Pellowski, Polish American educator and author, was born June 28, 1933, on the family farm in the Trempealeau County town of Arcadia, Wisconsin, daughter of Alexander and Anna (Dorawa) Pellowski, both of whom were descended from Kashubian immigrants. She was educated at Sacred Heart School in Pine Creek, Wisconsin; Cotter High School, and College of Saint Teresa in Winona, where she received her Bachelor of Arts in 1955. Upon graduation from Saint Teresa's, she studied at Munich University and the  International Youth Library also in Munich on a Fulbright Program grant. In 1959 she earned a Master of Arts in Library Science, with honors, from Columbia University.

As educator
From 1956-1966 Anne Pellowski was employed as a children's librarian and storyteller with the New York Public Library From 1966 to 1981 Anne was employed by the U.S. Committee for UNICEF as the founding director of the Information Center on Children's Cultures. After leaving this position she divided her time between writing (see below) and traveling throughout the world as a consultant to UNICEF, UNESCO, the World Council of Churches and many other international organizations. Late in her eighth decade of life, Anne Pellowski continues to travel the world giving presentations on storytelling and writing and empowering her listeners to tell their own stories and write them down in locales such as Ethiopia, Rwanda, Kenya, Nicaragua, Peru and others. She continues this as time passes and enjoys wonderful visits to all her nieces and nephews, grand nieces and nephews, and great-grand-nephews and nieces, scattered throughout the US. She also volunteers her time to give workshops in book making in local languages, and help in training for  children's libraries in underprivileged nations.

As author
Anne Pellowski is the author of numerous works on the theory and practice of storytelling, ranging from popular children's handbooks to scholarly academic articles. These include The World of Children's Literature (1968) The World of Storytelling (1977, revised edition 1991), The Story Vine: A Source Book of Unusual and Easy-to-Tell Stories from around the World (1984), The Family Storytelling Handbook: How to Use Stories, Anecdotes, Rhymes, Handkerchiefs, Paper, and Other Objects to Enrich Your Family Traditions (with Lynn Sweat, 1987) and The Storytelling Handbook: A Young People's Collection of Unusual Tales and Helpful Hints on How to Tell Them (1995).

Anne Pellowski is also the author of the "Latsch Valley Series" or "Polish American Girls Series:" five novels about life in the Kashubian Polish farm communities in Trempealeau County, Wisconsin. Each of the novels, Willow Wind Farm: Betsy's Story (1981), Stairstep Farm: Anna Rose's Story (1981), Winding Valley Farm: Annie's Story (1982), First Farm in the Valley: Anna's Story (1982), and Betsy's Up-and-Down Year (1998), treats one year in the life of a girl from four successive generations of the Pellowski family; a five-year-old Ms. Pellowski herself is the protagonist of Stairstep Farm. The novels were first and foremost intended as children's literature, and have been widely acclaimed for their success. However, the painstaking research and the abundant detail evident throughout all five novels marks them also as valuable historical-cultural documents in which, as Thomas J. Napierkalski observes, "Anne Pellowski has given Polish Americans a voice." In addition, Pellowski's novels are noted for moving "beyond the confines of Polishness through interethnic marriage and, more important, by showing the younger generation's acquisition of a global perspective."

Honors and awards
 1979: American Library Association Grolier Foundation Award
 1980: Constance Lindsay Skinner Women's National Book Association Award
 1985: Honorary Doctorate of Humane Letters, University of Colorado-Colorado Springs
 1992: Notable Wisconsin Author, Wisconsin Library Association
 2005: National Storytelling Network--Lifetime Achievement Award
 2018 Anne Pellowski: Storyteller to the World film shown in premiere at Frozen River Film Festival; film's producer, Mary Farrell,  given Viewer's Choice Award

References

1933 births
Living people
College of Saint Teresa alumni
Columbia University School of Library Service alumni
American people of Kashubian descent
American people of Polish descent
People from Winona, Minnesota
People from Arcadia, Wisconsin
Writers from Minnesota
Writers from Wisconsin